Lithuania is one of the most pro-United States nations in Europe and the world, with 73% of Lithuanians viewing the U.S. positively in 2011. According to the 2012 U.S. Global Leadership Report, 48% of Lithuanians approve of U.S. leadership, with 20% disapproving and 32% uncertain.

History

The United States established diplomatic relations with Lithuania on 28 July 1922. Following the start of the World War II, the Soviet invasion and occupation forced the closure of the Legation to Lithuania on 5 September 1940. However, Lithuanian Diplomatic Service in the United States continued uninterrupted. The United States never recognized the forced incorporation of Lithuania into the USSR and views the present government of Lithuania as a legal continuation of the interwar republic. In 2007, the United States and Lithuania celebrated 85 years of continuous diplomatic relations. Lithuania has enjoyed most-favored-nation treatment with the United States since December 1991. Since 1992, the United States has committed more than $100 million in Lithuania to economic and political transformation and to humanitarian needs. The United States and Lithuania signed an agreement on bilateral trade and intellectual property protection in 1994 and a bilateral investment treaty in 1997.  In 1998, the United States signed a "Charter of Partnership" with Lithuania and the other Baltic countries establishing bilateral working groups focusing on improving regional security, defense, and economic issues.

Today, over 650,000 individuals who identify as Lithuanian American live in the United States. Lithuanian immigration began before the United States even became a country, with individuals like Alexander Curtius settling in New Amsterdam (what would later become New York City) in 1659. Lithuania was part of the Polish–Lithuanian Commonwealth until 1795, when foreign powers partitioned it and Lithuania was largely incorporated into the Russian Empire. Despite attempts by the Tsarist government in Moscow to prevent residents of the empire from emigrating, many Lithuanians came to the United States throughout the 19th and early 20th Centuries, settling primarily in the Northeast (especially Pennsylvania) and the Midwest. Lithuanian immigration tapered off with the passage of nativist legislation like the Emergency Quota Act of 1921 and the Immigration Act of 1924 in Congress. Smaller waves of Lithuanian migration to the United States occurred at the end of World War II (thanks to the Displaced Persons Act) and when Lithuania regained independence following the dissolution of the Soviet Union in 1990.

Principal U.S. officials include:
 Ambassador—Deborah McCarthy
 Deputy Chief of Mission—Anne Hall
 Political and Economic Section Chief—John M. Finkbeiner Jr.
 PAO—Jonathan M. Berger
 Defense Attaché—Jeffrey L. Jennette
 Defense Cooperation Officer—Cynthia A. Matuskevich
 Management Officer—Alboino L. Deulus
 Consular Officer—Anthony T. Beaver

The U.S. Embassy in Lithuania is located in Vilnius (Akmenu 6).

Principal Lithuanian officials include:
 Ambassador - Rolandas Kriščiūnas
 Executive Assistant to the Ambassador - Eglė Janeliūnaitė
 Deputy Chief of Mission - Tomas Gulbinas

Gallery

See also 
 Lithuanian Americans
 Foreign relations of the United States
 Foreign relations of Lithuania

References

Further reading

 Gedmintas, Aleksandras. “Lithuanians.” In American Immigrant Cultures: Builders of a Nation, Vol. 2, edited by David Levinson and Melvin Ember, (Macmillan, 19970 pp 588–96..
 Granquist, Mark A. "Lithuanian Americans." in Gale Encyclopedia of Multicultural America, edited by Thomas Riggs, (3rd ed., vol. 3, Gale, 2014), pp. 111–127. Online
 Kuzmickaitė, Daiva Kristina. Between Two Worlds: Recent Lithuanian Immigrants in Chicago (1998–2000). (Vilnius: Versus Aureus, 2003).

 "Lithuanians" in Thernstrom, Stephan, Ann Orlov and Oscar Handlin, eds. Harvard Encyclopedia of American Ethnic Groups (1980) Online

External links 
 History of Lithuania - U.S. relations

 Embassy of the United States
 Embassy of the Republic of Lithuania to the USA

 
Bilateral relations of the United States
United States